Macrovelia is a genus of macroveliid shore bugs in the family Macroveliidae. There is one described species in Macrovelia, M. hornii. It prefers shaded areas and overwinters as an adult.

References

Further reading

 

Articles created by Qbugbot
Hydrometroidea
Gerromorpha genera